San Michele all'Adige (Trentino dialect: Samichél) is a comune (municipality) in Trentino in the northern Italian region Trentino-Alto Adige/Südtirol, located about  north of Trento.

Geography
The municipality borders Giovo, Lavis, Mezzocorona, Mezzolombardo, and Nave San Rocco. It includes the frazione (civil parish) of Grumo and Faedo.

See also
 Istituto Agrario di San Michele all’Adige

References

External links

Official website